= Kuthar, Bhopal =

Kuthar
- village
- Location within Madhya Pradesh Location within India
- Coordinates: 23.4134124°N 77.3295708°E
- Country: India
- State: Madhya Pradesh
- District: Bhopal
- Tehsil: Huzur
- Elevation: 507 m (1,663 ft)

Population (2011)
  - Total: 1,186
- Time zone: UTC+5:30 (IST)
- ISO 3166 code: MP-IN
- 2011 census code: 482378

Kuthar is a village in the Bhopal district of Madhya Pradesh, India. It is located in the Huzur tehsil and the Phanda block.

== Demographics ==
According to the 2011 census of India, Kuthar has 283 households. The effective literacy rate (i.e. the literacy rate of population excluding children aged 6 and below) is 72.12%.

Demographics (2011 Census)
	Total	Male	Female
Population	1186	634	552
Children aged below 6 years	146	85	61
Scheduled caste	171	83	88
Scheduled tribe	0	0	0
Literates	750	470	280
Workers (all)	542	342	200
Main workers (total)	425	320	105
Main workers: Cultivators	118	100	18
Main workers: Agricultural labourers	270	190	80
Main workers: Household industry workers	7	7	0
Main workers: Other	30	23	7
Marginal workers (total)	117	22	95
Marginal workers: Cultivators	2	0	2
Marginal workers: Agricultural labourers	104	18	86
Marginal workers: Household industry workers	2	1	1
Marginal workers: Others	9	3	6
Non-workers	644	292	352
